These are lists of South-Pacific, and Oceanian radio stations:

List of radio stations in Guam
List of radio stations in the Federated States of Micronesia
List of radio stations in New Zealand
List of radio stations in Palau

Australia
List of radio stations in Australian Capital Territory
List of radio stations in New South Wales
List of radio stations in Northern Territory
List of radio stations in Queensland
List of radio stations in South Australia
List of radio stations in Tasmania
List of radio stations in Victoria
List of radio stations in Western Australia
List of early radio broadcast stations in Western Australia

See also
Lists of radio stations in Africa
Lists of radio stations in the Americas  
Lists of radio stations in Asia 
Lists of radio stations in Europe

External links 
RFP - Radio Free Polynesia